Marvel's Hero Project is a documentary streaming television series by Marvel New Media for Disney+ streamed from November 12, 2019.

Premise 
The series will follow the young heroes who are making remarkable and positive change across communities by dedicating their lives in selfless acts of bravery and kindness. Every kid who features in the show will have their own Marvel comic.

Episodes

Development 
The series is announced as one of the two documentaries by Marvel for Disney+ on April 10, 2019. The editors at Marvel Comics found some innovative ways to include these kids as superheroes and to surprise them by revealing they are immortalised in Marvel Comics.

Release 
The first episode of the series launched on November 12, 2019, as one of the first titles for Disney+ with a new episode on every Friday. The series has 20 episodes in total.

Promotion 
At D23 Expo the series conducted a panel and explained about the series and revealed the release plan. On October 1, 2019, the first full trailer was released by Disney+. At New York Comic Con in early October, the first episode was screen by Marvel featuring Jordan Reeves, creator of Project Unicorn. Later on the day an exclusive clip was released online from the first episode.

Comics 
The comics will be available on Marvel Unlimited and Marvel Digital Comic Store for free concurrent with the episodes.

Reception

Critical reception 
The review aggregator website Rotten Tomatoes reported a 92% approval rating for the first season with an average rating of 7.90/10, based on 13 reviews. The website's critical consensus reads, "A heartwarming and powerful glimpse into the lives of some real life heroes, Marvel's Hero Project finds inspiration in a new generation of innovators." Metacritic, which uses a weighted average, assigned a score of 54 out of 100 based on 5 critics, indicating "mixed or average reviews".

Dave Trumbore writing for Collider said, "The non-fiction show reveals the remarkable, positive change 20 young, real-life heroes are making in their own communities. These inspiring, driven and engaging kids have dedicated their lives to selfless acts of bravery and kindness, and now, Marvel celebrates them by welcoming them into Marvel’s Hero Project." Joel Keller of Decider found that the documentary provides inspirational stories, claiming it demonstrates how differences can become beneficial, while saying that the show empowers the audience and encourage creativity. CNET's Bonnie Burton declared, "Marvel's Hero Project on Disney Plus spotlights real kids making a difference." Melissa Camacho of Common Sense Media rated the documentary 5 out of 5 stars, stating: "Marvel's Hero Project is an uplifting series that profiles heroic tweens and teens who are taking leadership roles in their communities and proactively trying to making a positive difference in the world." Matt Fowler for IGN rated the series 7,5 out of 10 and wrote: "Marvel's Hero Project is a well-intentioned and nicely-presented packaging of profiles featuring some uniquely inspiring young warriors willfully making the world a better place. It's not entirely suited for a 30 minute format, and you can often feel the strain, but it's never not uplifting."

Accolades

References

External links 

 
 

2010s American documentary television series
2019 American television series debuts
English-language television shows
Disney+ original programming
Marvel Entertainment